Jack Fletcher Jr. was an Australian rules footballer for the Port Adelaide Football Club. Before becoming a footballer Fletcher was a successful inter-state Lacrosse player. After being a premiership captain with Port Adelaide in 1906, Fletcher returned to playing Lacrosse.

References

Port Adelaide Football Club (SANFL) players
Port Adelaide Football Club players (all competitions)
Australian rules footballers from South Australia
Australian lacrosse players